Bretwalda (also brytenwalda and bretenanwealda, sometimes capitalised) is an Old English word. The first record comes from the late 9th-century Anglo-Saxon Chronicle. It is given to some of the rulers of Anglo-Saxon kingdoms from the 5th century onwards who had achieved overlordship of some or all of the other Anglo-Saxon kingdoms. It is unclear whether the word dates back to the 5th century and was used by the kings themselves or whether it is a later, 9th-century, invention. The term bretwalda also appears in a 10th-century charter of Æthelstan. The literal meaning of the word is disputed and may translate to either 'wide-ruler' or 'Britain-ruler'.

The rulers of Mercia were generally the most powerful of the Anglo-Saxon kings from the mid 7th century to the early 9th century but are not accorded the title of bretwalda by the Chronicle, which had an anti-Mercian bias. The Annals of Wales continued to recognise the kings of Northumbria as "Kings of the Saxons" until the death of Osred I of Northumbria in 716.

Bretwaldas

Listed by Bede and the Anglo-Saxon Chronicle

 Ælle of Sussex (488– 514)
 Ceawlin of Wessex (560–592, died 593)
 Æthelberht of Kent (590–616)
 Rædwald of East Anglia (c. 600–around 624)
 Edwin of Deira (616–633)
 Oswald of Northumbria (633–642)
 Oswiu of Northumbria (642–670)

Mercian rulers with similar or greater authority
 Penda of Mercia (626/633–655)
 Wulfhere of Mercia (658–675)
 Æthelred of Mercia (675–704, died 716)
 Æthelbald of Mercia (716–757)
 Offa of Mercia (757–796)
 Cœnwulf of Mercia (796–821)

Listed only by the Anglo-Saxon Chronicle
 Egbert of Wessex (829–839)
 Alfred of Wessex (871–899)

Other claimants
 Æthelstan of Wessex (927–939)

Etymology
The first syllable of the term bretwalda may be related to Briton or Britain. The second element is taken to mean 'ruler' or 'sovereign', though is more literally 'wielder'. Thus, this interpretation would mean 'sovereign of Britain' or 'wielder of Britain'. The word may be a compound containing the Old English adjective brytten (from the verb breotan meaning 'to break' or 'to disperse'), an element also found in the terms bryten rice ('kingdom'), bryten-grund ('the wide expanse of the earth') and bryten cyning ('king whose authority was widely extended'). Though the origin is ambiguous, the draughtsman of the charter issued by Æthelstan used the term in a way that can only mean 'wide-ruler'.

The latter etymology was first suggested by John Mitchell Kemble who alluded that "of six manuscripts in which this passage occurs, one only reads Bretwalda: of the remaining five, four have Bryten-walda or -wealda, and one Breten-anweald, which is precisely synonymous with Brytenwealda"; that Æthelstan was called brytenwealda ealles ðyses ealondes, which Kemble translates as 'ruler of all these islands'; and that bryten- is a common prefix to words meaning 'wide or general dispersion' and that the similarity to the word bretwealh ('Briton') is "merely accidental".

Contemporary use
The first recorded use of the term Bretwalda comes from a West Saxon chronicle of the late 9th century that applied the term to Ecgberht, who ruled Wessex from 802 to 839. The chronicler also wrote down the names of seven kings that Bede listed in his Historia ecclesiastica gentis Anglorum in 731. All subsequent manuscripts of the Chronicle use the term Brytenwalda, which may have represented the original term or derived from a common error.

There is no evidence that the term was a title that had any practical use, with implications of formal rights, powers and office, or even that it had any existence before the 9th-century. Bede wrote in Latin and never used the term and his list of kings holding imperium should be treated with caution, not least in that he overlooks kings such as Penda of Mercia, who clearly held some kind of dominance during his reign. Similarly, in his list of bretwaldas, the West Saxon chronicler ignored such Mercian kings as Offa.

The use of the term Bretwalda was the attempt by a West Saxon chronicler to make some claim of West Saxon kings to the whole of Great Britain. The concept of the overlordship of the whole of Britain was at least recognised in the period, whatever was meant by the term. Quite possibly it was a survival of a Roman concept of "Britain": it is significant that, while the hyperbolic inscriptions on coins and titles in charters often included the title rex Britanniae, when England was unified the title used was rex Angulsaxonum, ('king of the Anglo-Saxons'.)

Modern interpretation by historians
For some time, the existence of the word bretwalda in the Anglo-Saxon Chronicle, which was based in part on the list given by Bede in his Historia Ecclesiastica, led historians to think that there was perhaps a "title" held by Anglo-Saxon overlords. This was particularly attractive as it would lay the foundations for the establishment of an English monarchy. The 20th-century historian Frank Stenton said of the Anglo-Saxon chronicler that "his inaccuracy is more than compensated by his preservation of the English title applied to these outstanding kings". He argued that the term bretwalda "falls into line with the other evidence which points to the Germanic origin of the earliest English institutions".

Over the later 20th century, this assumption was increasingly challenged. Patrick Wormald interpreted it as "less an objectively realized office than a subjectively perceived status" and emphasised the partiality of its usage in favour of Southumbrian rulers. In 1991, Steven Fanning argued that "it is unlikely that the term ever existed as a title or was in common usage in Anglo-Saxon England".  The fact that Bede never mentioned a special title for the kings in his list implies that he was unaware of one.  In 1995, Simon Keynes observed that "if Bede's concept of the Southumbrian overlord, and the chronicler's concept of the 'Bretwalda', are to be regarded as artificial constructs, which have no validity outside the context of the literary works in which they appear, we are released from the assumptions about political development which they seem to involve... we might ask whether kings in the eighth and ninth centuries were quite so obsessed with the establishment of a pan-Southumbrian state".

Modern interpretations view the concept of bretwalda overlordship as complex and an important indicator of how a 9th-century chronicler interpreted history and attempted to insert the increasingly powerful Saxon kings into that history.

Overlordship
A complex array of dominance and subservience existed during the Anglo-Saxon period. A king who used charters to grant land in another kingdom indicated such a relationship. If the other kingdom were fairly large, as when the Mercians dominated the East Anglians, the relationship would have been more equal than in the case of the Mercian dominance of the Hwicce, which was a comparatively small kingdom. Mercia was arguably the most powerful Anglo-Saxon kingdom for much of the late 7th though 8th centuries, though Mercian kings are missing from the two main "lists". For Bede, Mercia was a traditional enemy of his native Northumbria and he regarded powerful kings such as the pagan Penda as standing in the way of the Christian conversion of the Anglo-Saxons. Bede omits them from his list, even though it is evident that Penda held a considerable degree of power. Similarly powerful Mercia kings such as Offa are missed out of the West Saxon Anglo-Saxon Chronicle, which sought to demonstrate the legitimacy of their kings to rule over other Anglo-Saxon peoples.

See also
 List of monarchs of East Anglia
 List of monarchs of Essex
 List of monarchs of Kent
 List of monarchs of Sussex
 List of monarchs of Wessex
 List of monarchs of Mercia
 List of monarchs of Northumbria
 List of English monarchs (to 1707)
 List of legendary kings of Britain
 Kings of the Britons (contemporaries with Anglo-Saxon kings)
 High King
 Emperor

Notes

References
 Fanning, Steven. "Bede, Imperium, and the Bretwaldas." Speculum 66 (1991): 1–26.
 Wormald, Patrick. "Bede, the Bretwaldas and the Origins of the Gens Anglorum." In Ideal and Reality in Frankish and Anglo-Saxon Society, ed. P. Wormald et al. Oxford, 1983. 99–129.

Further reading
 Charles-Edwards, T. M. "The continuation of Bede, s.a. 750. High-kings, kings of Tara and Bretwaldas." In Seanchas. Studies in early and medieval Irish archaeology, history and literature in honour of Francis J. Byrne, ed. Alfred P. Smyth. Dublin: Four Courts, 2000. 137–45.
 Dumville, David "The Terminology of Overkingship in Early Anglo-Saxon England." In The Anglo-Saxons from the Migration period to the Eighth Century. An Ethnographic Perspective, ed. J. Hines (1997): 345–65
 Keynes, Simon. "Bretwalda." In The Blackwell Encyclopaedia of Anglo-Saxon England, ed. Michael Lapidge et al. Oxford, 1999.
 Kirby, D. P. The Making of Early England. London, 1967.
 Wormald, Patrick. "Bede, Beowulf and the conversion of the Anglo-Saxon aristocracy." In Bede and Anglo-Saxon England. Papers in honour of the 1300th anniversary of the birth of Bede, ed. R. T. Farrell. BAR, British series 46. 1978. 32–95.
 Yorke, Barbara. "The vocabulary of Anglo-Saxon overlordship." Anglo-Saxon Studies in Archaeology and History 2 (1981): 171–200.

Anglo-Saxon monarchs
English monarchs
Feudalism in England
Royal titles